Henry Henderson Allison (born February 11, 1947) is a former professional American football offensive tackle. He was selected in the 2nd round of the 1971 NFL Draft by the Philadelphia Eagles after playing college football at San Diego State.

After two seasons with the Eagles, Allison contributed another three seasons with the St. Louis Cardinals and finished his NFL career with the Denver Broncos.

1947 births
American football offensive tackles
Denver Broncos players
Living people
Philadelphia Eagles players
Players of American football from Alabama
People from Stevenson, Alabama
San Diego State Aztecs football players
St. Louis Cardinals (football) players